Jerónimo Manrique de Lara y de Herrera, O. de M. (1581 – 22 June 1644) was a Roman Catholic prelate who served as Bishop of Santiago de Cuba (1630–1644).>

Biography
Jerónimo Manrique de Lara y de Herrera was born in Valladolid, Spain in 1581 and ordained a priest in the Order of the Blessed Virgin Mary of Mercy.
On 7 January 1630, he was appointed during the papacy of Pope Urban VIII as Bishop of Santiago de Cuba and installed on 30 November 1630.
He served as Bishop of Santiago de Cuba until his death on 22 June 1644.

References

External links and additional sources
 (for Chronology of Bishops)  
 (for Chronology of Bishops) 

17th-century Roman Catholic bishops in Cuba
Bishops appointed by Pope Urban VIII
1581 births
1644 deaths
Roman Catholic bishops of Santiago de Cuba